The 1950 Delaware State Hornets football team represented Delaware State College—now known as Delaware State University—as a member of the Colored Intercollegiate Athletic Association (CIAA) in the 1950 college football season. Led by coach Robert White in his first year, the Hornets compiled a 2–7–1 record, including being shut out five times.

Schedule

References

Delaware State
Delaware State Hornets football seasons
Delaware State Hornets football